The Youth Climate Movement (YouNGO) or International Youth Climate Movement (IYCM) refers to an international network of youth organisations that collectively aims to inspire, empower and mobilise a generational movement of young people to take positive action on climate change.

Organisation

Formation 
Since the Rio Earth Summit in 1992, individual youth have been participating in international negotiations related to different environmental and sustainable development issues. With the formation of the European Youth Forum in 1996, and the U.S. youth organization SustainUS in 2001, youth-run organizations began to send delegations of youth to actively participation in these various worldwide negotiations, principally through the United Nations. Individual youth had been participating in the United Nations Framework Convention on Climate Change, and with the new level of youth organization participation in international negotiations, youth organizations began to identify the UN climate negotiations as a new forum to increase youth participation in.

From November 28 to December 9, 2005, the United Nations (UN) Climate Change Convention (COP 11 or COP/MOP 1) took place at the Palais des congrès de Montréal in Montreal, Quebec, Canada. Youth delegations from member nations, including the United States (via SustainUS), Canada, and Australia, attended to advocate on behalf of young people. As a result, the concept of the International Youth Climate Movement was first developed, though it was originally referred to as the International Youth Delegation, referring to the youth delegates at the international climate negotiations.

Following on from this in September 2006, the Canadian Youth Climate Coalition was launched, consisting of 48 youth organisations from across the nation. This was soon followed by the Australian Youth Climate Coalition in November, which itself was a coalition of 27 youth organisations from across Australia.

In March 2008, the Indian Youth Climate Network joined the Global Youth Climate Movement whilst in June 2008, the United Kingdom ambassadors to the World Wide Fund for Nature's Voyage for the Future programme, Emma Biermann and Casper ter Kuile, created the UK Youth Climate Coalition (UKYCC), after returning from the Arctic to witness the impact of climate change. More recently, coalitions in Africa, China, Japan, Pacific Islands and South Asia have been established with the same mission statement as the International Youth Climate Movement.

Structure 
Across the world, there are youth organisations who have formed coalitions to take positive action on climate change, such as the UK Youth Climate Coalition, which are led entirely by a team of young people. Each Climate Coalition or Climate Network is affiliated to a regional or continental movement. These movements include the African Youth Initiative on Climate Change; Caribbean Youth Environmental Network; European Youth Climate Movement; Project Survival Pacific; Nordic Youth Climate Action Movement; North East Asia Youth Environmental Network; the South American Youth Climate Coalition and the South Asia Youth Environment Network. Consequently, these local, national and continental organisations come together to form the International Youth Climate Movement.

Governance 
The International Youth Climate Movement, although an umbrella term for the movements of young people taking place across the world, is run by teams of volunteers. These teams of volunteers organise themselves into different working groups and form the central organs of the movement, coordinated by a "Bottomlining Team" that helps to organize their efforts, especially at international climate negotiations.

Funding 
The movement is funded by contributions from its member organisations, as well as occasional contributions from organizations like UNICEF and the government of the Netherlands.

Members 

National members of the Youth Climate Movement include: the AYLCF Climate Action Network (France); Australian Youth Climate Coalition; Canadian Youth Climate Coalition; Arab Youth Climate Movement, China Youth Climate Action Network; ECO Singapore; Energy Action Coalition (U.S.A.), headed by coalition organization SustainUS; Project Survival Pacific, Ghana National Youth Coalition on Climate Change; Hong Kong Climate Change Coalition; Indian Youth Climate Network; Japan Youth Ecology League; Malaysian Youth Climate Justice Network; Nature and Youth Denmark; New Zealand Youth Delegation; Nigerian Youth Green Coalition on Climate Change; Russian Youth Climate Movement; Taiwan Youth Climate Coalition; Bangladesh Youth Movement for Climate (BYMC); Young Friends of the Earth; World Alliance of YMCAs; World Association of Girl Guides and Girl Scouts; World Organisation of the Scout Movement, Malaysia Youth Delegation (MYD) and the UK Youth Climate Coalition.

Campaigns 
Alongside the national campaigns undertaken by the domestic coalitions and domestic networks, such as the Power Shift conferences, the International Youth also undertake their own global campaigns, which are coordinated by a team of young volunteers.

Conference of Youth 
The first Conference of Youth (COY) was held in 2005, in Montreal, Canada, shortly before the Eleventh Conference of Parties. The event brings together youth delegates for sharing resources, training, networking and collective discussions. It is also an opportunity for the youth climate movement to plan their activities over the course of the negotiations and the subsequent year.

The fifth Conference of Youth took place at the University of Copenhagen from the 4–6 December 2009 where over 700 young people from 100 countries are reported to have attended. The sixth was held at the Universidad del Caribe in preparation for the Cancun climate negotiations.

The two- or three-day event takes place annually, and it is scheduled each year to be held shortly before the United Nations Conference of Parties, where nations convene to assess the progress of the climate negotiations.

Participation at the UNFCCC negotiation process 

Since 2005, each domestic coalition or network within the Youth Climate Movement has sent a delegation to the United Nations Climate Change Conference (UNFCCC) to represent young people in their respective country.

In June 2009, the youth organisations participating in the United Nations climate change negotiations submitted an application to become a constituency. In August 2009, the constituency application was provisionally approved by the climate change Secretariat, making youth the 7th constituency to join the climate negotiations. The official title for the youth participation to the climate negotiations is 'YOUNGO'. The maiden focal points for the YOUNGO elected were Wilson Ang (Singapore), sponsored by SustainUS, and Lina Li (China), sponsored by 350.org, representing the International Youth Climate Movement in an official capacity (despite the provisional status until 2011).

Currently, the elected focal points who represent the International Youth Climate Movement are Lauren Nutter (U.S.A.), sponsored by SustainUS, and Jean Paul Brice Affana (Cameroon), sponsored by Jeunes Volontaires pour l'Environnement. They follow 2010-2011 Focal Points, Sébastien Duyck (France), sponsored by Service Civil International and Rishikesh Ram Bhandary (Nepal), sponsored by SustainUS.

Throughout the year, there are other opportunities for the members of the International Youth Climate Movement to convene. For example, at the International Youth Summit on Energy and Climate Change in Beijing, China

In 2021 the health working group in the organization demanded the participation of youth climate activists in post COVID-19 pandemic recovery, as the pandemic is probably linked to climate change.

Think 2050 Campaign 
In 2009, the UK Youth Climate Coalition worked with the Youth Movement, in particular the European Youth Climate Movement and SustainUS to launch the "How old will you be in 2050?" campaign at the United Nations Climate negotiations taking place in Bonn, Germany. The slogan has been used by the Youth Movement since then and was also the focus for the International Youth "Young and Future Generations Day" in December 2009. The campaign seeks to emphasise the need to cut carbon emissions by 80% by 2050 on 1990 levels, as young people will be the ones to inherit this world and decisions made today will have a direct impact on their lives in 40 years time.

Participation in writing an international report 
In 2022, a team of scientists published a report called "Stockholm+50: Unlocking a Better Future", which analyzed the impact of the United Nations Conference on the Human Environment in 1972 and offered recommendations for the future. The key message is to "redefine the relationship between humans and nature, achieve lasting prosperity for all, and invest in a better future." In addition, youth researchers issued a youth version of the report: "Charting a Youth Vision for a Just and Sustainable Future". The key messages are: "Health well being and communal solidarity, living in harmony with nature, international solidarity-living as one global family, a world when all humans are equal." The Youth Climate Movement (YOUNGO) and some of its members helped craft the report.

See also 

Australian Youth Climate Coalition
Canadian Youth Climate Coalition
Energy Action Coalition
Indian Youth Climate Network
SustainUS
UK Youth Climate Coalition
Young Friends of the Earth
Malaysia Youth Delegation
Green Africa Youth Organization (GAYO)

References

External links 

International climate change organizations
International nongovernmental youth organizations
Youth-led organizations
Climate change and society